DYME (95.9 FM), broadcasting as The Ranch 95.9, is a radio station owned and operated by Masbate Community Broadcasting Company. Its studios & transmitter are located at DYME Bldg., Zurbito St., Brgy. Pating, Masbate City. This is the only FM radio station in Masbate to be affiliated with Radio Mindanao Network with news programs from DWNX.

References

News and talk radio stations in the Philippines
Radio stations established in 1990